Union Station/Northwest 6th & Hoyt and Union Station/Northwest 5th & Glisan are light rail stations on the MAX Green, Orange and Yellow Lines in Portland, Oregon. They are the first stops southbound on the Portland Transit Mall MAX extension. The Union Station/Northwest 6th & Hoyt Street station is served only by the Green and Yellow Lines, and the Union Station/Northwest 5th & Glisan Street station is served only by the Green and Orange Lines.  Originally, from the opening of these stations in 2009 until 2015, the Yellow Line served both, but in September 2015 the then-new Orange Line replaced the Yellow Line at all southbound stations on the transit mall.

The stations are built into the sidewalks of 5th and 6th Avenues, with the 5th Avenue platform used by southbound trains and the 6th Avenue platform by northbound trains. They are located next to Union Station, where there are connections to Amtrak and Greyhound buses.

When opened on August 30, 2009, the stations were located in Fareless Square (within fare zone 1), which was renamed the Free Rail Zone four months later, but the fare-free zone was eliminated in 2012 when TriMet discontinued all use of fare zones.

External links
NW 5th & Glisan station information from TriMet
NW 6th & Hoyt station information from TriMet
MAX Light Rail Stations – more general TriMet page

2009 establishments in Oregon
MAX Green Line
MAX Light Rail double stations
MAX Yellow Line
Northwest Portland, Oregon
Old Town Chinatown
Railway stations in Portland, Oregon
Railway stations in the United States opened in 2009